The black garden eel (Heteroconger perissodon) is an eel in the family Congridae (conger/garden eels). It was described by James Erwin Böhlke and John Ernest Randall in 1981. It is a tropical, nonmigratory marine eel which is known from the western Pacific Ocean, including Ambon, Indonesia, and Negros, Philippines. It dwells at a depth range of 1–35 m. It leads a benthic lifestyle, and inhabits sand or mud, living solitary or in colonies. Males can reach a maximum total length of 53.7 cm.

References

External links

Heteroconger
Fish described in 1981
Taxa named by James Erwin Böhlke
Taxa named by John Ernest Randall